This article is a list of opinion polls that have been taken for the 2022 South Korean presidential election. It is divided into polls for intended candidates, and then for the presidential election itself. Two-way polls are used to demonstrate the popularity of one candidate with respect to another, but the election itself will have no run-off round and will be held under a system of first-past-the-post. The polls are ordered by date, with the newest at the top.

Opinion polling

Polling after nominees confirmed

Graphical summary

Polling average

2022

Official campaign 
This table below lists polls completed since the publication of the official list of candidates on 15 February until the vote on 9 March 2022. The publication of polls are prohibited from 3 March 2022.

1 February to 14 February

January

2021

Polling before nominees finalized

Hypothetical polling

Lee Jae-myung vs. Yoon Suk-yeol

Notes

References

South Korea
Presidential elections in South Korea
Opinion polling in South Korea